Satoru Abe (born 13 June 1926) is a Japanese American sculptor and painter.

Biography 
 

Abe was born in Moiliili, a district of Honolulu, Hawaii. He attended President William McKinley High School, where he took art lessons from Shirley Ximena Hopper Russell. After graduating from high school he worked for the Dairymen's Association. In 1947 he began taking art lessons from Hon Chew Hee and decided to pursue an art career in New York City. On his way to New York, in 1948, Abe spent a summer at the California School for Fine Arts. When he reached New York Abe attended the Art Students League of New York where he studied with Yasuo Kuniyoshi, George Grosz, Louis Bouche and Jon Corbino, N.A. (1905-1964). From 1948 to 1959, Abe traveled to New York regularly. He married Ruth, a fellow student from Wahiawa, and they returned to Hawaii in 1950 with their daughter Gail.

In Hawaii Abe met local artist Isami Doi, who would become a close friend and mentor. Although Abe began as a painter, he learned welding from Bumpei Akaji in 1951, and the two artists began a series of copper work experiments. During these few years in Hawaii, Abe also formed the Metcalf Chateau with Bumpei Akaji, Edmund Chung, Tetsuo Ochikubo, Jerry T. Okimoto, James Park, and Tadashi Sato. Their first group exhibition was in 1954.

In 1956, Abe returned to New York and found a creative home at the SculptureCenter, where his work attracted the attention of gallery owners and others. In 1963, Abe was awarded a Guggenheim Fellowship. Abe returned to Hawai'i in 1970, and in the same year was offered a National Endowment for the Arts Artist in Resident grant.

Beliefs 
Abe believes in reincarnation and this has influenced his work.

Works
Abe is best known for his sculptures of abstracted natural forms, many of which resemble trees, such as East and West in the collection of the Hawaii State Art Museum. He also painted. Two Abstract Figures in the collection of the Honolulu Museum of Art typifies this aspect of his work. The Honolulu Museum of Art and the Hawaii State Art Museum are among the public collections that hold Abe's works. His sculptures in public places include:
 Three Rocks on a Hill, Honolulu Community College, Honolulu, Hawaii, 1975
 Among the Ruins, Leeward Community College, Honolulu, Hawaii, 1973
 Tree of Knowledge, Nanakuli High and Intermediate School, Nanakuli, Hawaii, 1971
 Enchanting Garden, President William McKinley High School, Honolulu, Hawaii, 1983
 Three Clouds, Honolulu International Airport, Honolulu, Hawaii, 1974
 An Island of Trees, Honolulu International Airport, Diamond Head Extension, Honolulu, Hawaii, 1987
 The Seed, Farrington High School, Honolulu, Hawaii, 1996
 Reaching for the Sun, Hawaii Convention Center, Honolulu, Hawaii, 1997
 Early Spring, 'Aiea High School, Honolulu, Hawaii, 1976
 A Community Surrounded by Sugar Cane, Kamiloa Elementary School, Honolulu, Hawaii, 1978.
 Moon Beyond the Fence, Pearl City High School, Honolulu, Hawaii, 1981
 Spring, Summer, Autumn, James B. Castle High School, Honolulu, Hawaii, 1980.
 Five Logs on a Hill, Kau High and Pahala Elementary School, Pahala, Hawaii, 1975
 Landscape on the Ocean, Waiakea High School, Waiakea, Hawaii, 1983
 Reaching for the Sun, Iao School, Wailuku, Hawaii, 1981
 A Path Through the Trees, Maui High School, Kahului, Hawaii, 1977
 Trees, Vines, Rocks, and Petroglyphs, Lanai Community School, Lanai City, Hawaii, 1976
 Boulders, Salt Pond and Taro Fields, Eleele Elementary School, Eleele, Hawaii, 1989
 Aged Tree, Kauikeaouli Hale, Honolulu, Hawaii, 1976
 Untitled sculpture, Leilehua High School, Honolulu, Hawaii, 1976
 Volcano, Aloha Stadium, Honolulu, Hawaii, 1980
Growing Out From the Wheel, The Contemporary Museum at First Hawaiian Center, Honolulu, Hawaii, 2006

References
 Abe, Satoru, Sketches 1956-1966 in Bamboo Ridge: Journal of Hawai'i Literature and Arts, Fall 1991, 7-12.
 Clarke, Joan and Diane Dods, Artists/Hawaii, Honolulu, University of Hawaii Press, 1996, 2-7.
 Contemporary Museum, Honolulu, Satoru Abe, A Retrospective 1948-1998, Honolulu, The Contemporary Museum, Honolulu, 1998.
 Department of Education, State of Hawaii, Artists of Hawaii, Honolulu, Department of Education, State of Hawaii, 1985, pp. 31–38.
 Doi, Isami, Excerpts from "Letters to Satoru Abe, 1952-1965" in Bamboo Ridge: Journal of Hawai'i Literature and Arts, Spring 1998, 57-64.
 Haar, Francis and Neogy, Prithwish, Artists of Hawaii: Nineteen Painters and Sculptors, University of Hawaii Press, 1974, 19-25.
 Hartwell, Patricia L. (editor), Retrospective 1967-1987, Hawaii State Foundation on Culture and the Arts, Honolulu, Hawaii, 1987, p. 115
 Honolulu Museum of Art, Spalding House Self-guided Tour, Sculpture Garden, 2014, pp. 12 & 15
 International Art Society of Hawai'i, Kuilima Kākou, Hawai'i-Japan Joint Exhibition, Honolulu, International Art Society of Hawai'i, 2004, p. 7
 Morse, Marcia, Legacy: Facets of Island Modernism, Honolulu, Honolulu Academy of Arts, 2001, pp. 14, 28-33
 Morse, Marcia (ed.), Honolulu Printmakers, Honolulu, Honolulu Academy of Arts, 2003, p. 80, 
 Morse, Marcia and Allison Wong, 10 Years: The Contemporary Museum at First Hawaiian Center, The Contemporary Museum, Honolulu, 2006, p. 10
 Radford, Georgia and Warren Radford, Sculpture in the Sun, Hawaii's Art for Open Spaces, University of Hawaii Press, 1978, 91.
 Wong, Allison, The Contemporary Museum at First Hawaiian Center, The Contemporary Museum, Honolulu HI, 2006, p. 10
 Yoshihara, Lisa A., Collective Visions, 1967-1997, Hawaii State Foundation on Culture and the Arts, Honolulu, Hawaii, 1997, 17.

Footnotes

1926 births
Living people
American male sculptors
Modern sculptors
American artists of Japanese descent
Artists from Honolulu
American male painters
Sculptors from Hawaii
20th-century American painters
20th-century American sculptors
21st-century American painters
21st-century American sculptors
20th-century American male artists